PNM Resources is an energy holding company based in New Mexico, in the United States. The acronym "PNM" by itself usually refers to the PNM Resources subsidiary Public Service Company of New Mexico.

Headquartered in Albuquerque, PNM Resources has approximately 2,530 megawatts of generation capacity and serves electricity to 498,000 homes and businesses in northern and central New Mexico and parts of West Texas.

Primary holdings

Public Service Company of New Mexico (PNM)
Public Service Company of New Mexico is a corporation that is wholly owned by PNM Resources.

Headquartered in Albuquerque, it provides electricity to more than 500,000 residential and business customers in Greater Albuquerque, Rio Rancho, Los Lunas and Belen, Santa Fe, Las Vegas, Alamogordo, Ruidoso, Silver City, Deming, Bayard, Lordsburg and Clayton, as well as the tribal communities of the Tesuque, Cochiti, Santo Domingo, San Felipe, Santa Ana, Sandia, Isleta and Laguna Pueblos. Elsewhere, rural electric cooperatives provide much of the power. PNM is a significant owner of the San Juan generation facility, a coal-fired plant located near Farmington, New Mexico, and a 10% owner in the Palo Verde Nuclear Generating Facility near Phoenix, AZ. PNM also owns and operates several natural gas-fired plants throughout the state of New Mexico including Reeves Generating Station in Albuquerque, most of which are used to meet additional demand for electricity in the summer months. PNM employs approximately 2,000 people and has been noted as one of the top companies in the United States for minorities to work for.

Texas—New Mexico Power Company

Texas—New Mexico Power is a corporation that is wholly owned by PNM Resources. It is a regulated electric utility operating in Texas. TNP was sold in a leveraged buyout in 2000. PNM acquired Texas—New Mexico Power in 2005 and moved the New Mexico properties to PNM in 2006. TNP is headquartered in Lewisville, Texas.

Corporate organization and history
PNM was founded in 1917 as the Albuquerque Gas and Electric Company. PNM sold the gas part of the business to Southern Union Gas Company of Dallas in 1949.  These sold portions became the Gas Company of New Mexico.  In 1985, however, PNM reacquired the Gas Company of New Mexico after Southern Union Gas Company reached a settlement stemming from federal antitrust litigation.  In 1994, both electric and gas operations began serving customers as PNM.

In May 2003, PNM Resources' utility subsidiary PNM was recognized by the American Wind Energy Association's Utility Leadership Award for PNM's role in creation of the New Mexico Wind Energy Center. The award was presented at the National Wind Energy Conference in Austin, Texas.

In 2008, PNM sold New Mexico Gas to Continental Energy, a company backed by the private equity firm Lindsay Goldberg. It was later acquired by TECO Energy. It will soon become a division of Halifax, Canada-based Emera when its acquisition of TECO Energy closes by mid-2016.

PNM's current leadership is as follows:

 Pat Vincent-Collawn - chairman, president and chief executive officer
 Chuck Eldred - executive vice president and chief financial officer
 Patrick Apodaca - senior vice president and general counsel
 Ron Darnell - senior vice president of public policy
 Lisa Eden - vice president and treasurer
 Mike Mertz - vice president and chief information officer
 Laurie Monfiletto - vice president of human resources
 Chris Olson - senior vice president of utility operations
 Gerard Ortiz - vice president of regulatory affairs and economic development
 Don Tarry - vice president of finance and controller
 Becky Teague - vice president of external affairs

On October 21, 2020, the company announced a strategic merger with Avangrid, a subsidiary of Iberdrola.

References

External links

Companies based in Albuquerque, New Mexico
Companies listed on the New York Stock Exchange
Natural gas companies of the United States
Nuclear power companies of the United States
Electric power companies of the United States